Arawata is a town in Victoria, Australia. It is located 10km north-west of Leongatha.

Demographics
As of the 2016 Australian census, 79 people resided in Arawata. The median age of persons in Arawata was 55 years. There were more males than females, with 53.8% of the population male and 46.3% female. The average household size was 2 people per household.

References

Towns in Victoria (Australia)
Shire of South Gippsland